Beryllium compounds